Huron is an unincorporated community in Henderson County, Tennessee, United States. Its ZIP code is 38345. It has an estimated population of 2251 with a density of 45 persons per square mile.

Demographics
94.4% of total population is white and the remaining 5.6% is black.

Notes

Unincorporated communities in Henderson County, Tennessee
Unincorporated communities in Tennessee